Marta Fernández Farrés (born December 21, 1981, in Barcelona) is a retired Spanish women's basketball player. A 1.80 m (5'11") guard, she won three bronze medals with the Spain women's national basketball team. At club level, she played in 2007 with the Los Angeles Sparks of the United States' WNBA., the Polish team Wisła Can-Pack Kraków and the Spanish teams Universitari Barcelona, Ros Casares Valencia and Perfumerías Avenida, where she retired in 2015. Marta Fernández is the sister of Spanish international and Real Madrid shooting guard Rudy Fernández.

Club career 
Fernández spent her formative years at Segle XXI, where young prospects are recruited. She played for them in the Spanish top-tier league with Popular Godella / Ros Casares (1999-2004, 2010–11), Universitari Barcelona (2004–07) and CB Avenida (2011-2015), winning a total of five leagues and six domestic cups. She was the 2007 and 2008 MVP of the Spanish League.

She spent the summer of 2007 at the Los Angeles Sparks and the 2007–2010 seasons with Wisła Can-Pack Kraków.

EuroLeague stats 
Source: FIBA

National team 
She made her debut with Spain women's national basketball team at the age of 18. She played with the senior team from 2000 to 2012. She is one of the most capped players with a total of 120 caps and 8.2 PPG. She participated in the (Athens 2004 Olympics, three World Championships and two European Championships:

5th 1997 FIBA Europe Under-16 Championship (youth)
 998 FIBA Europe Under-18 Championship (youth)
5th 2000 FIBA Europe Under-20 Championship (youth)
 5th 2002 World Championship
  2003 Eurobasket
 6th 2004 Summer Olympics
  2005 Eurobasket
 8th 2006 World Championship
  2010 World Championship

References

External links
 
 
 

1981 births
Living people
Basketball players at the 2004 Summer Olympics
Basketball players from Barcelona
Competitors at the 2001 Mediterranean Games
Los Angeles Sparks players
Mediterranean Games bronze medalists for Spain
Mediterranean Games medalists in basketball
Olympic basketball players of Spain
Shooting guards
Spanish expatriate basketball people in Poland
Spanish expatriate basketball people in the United States
Spanish women's basketball players
21st-century Spanish women